Alderfen Broad is a  biological Site of Special Scientific Interest north-east of Norwich in Norfolk. It is managed by the Norfolk Wildlife Trust. It is part of the Broadland Ramsar site and Special Protection Area and The Broads Special Area of Conservation,

This area of fenland peat has open water, alder carr woodland and reedswamp. Breeding birds include the great crested grebe, water rail, grasshopper warbler and reed warbler.

The site is open to the public.

References

Sites of Special Scientific Interest in Norfolk
Norfolk Wildlife Trust
Special Protection Areas in England
Special Areas of Conservation in England
Ramsar sites in England
Alder carrs